Anarak (also Romanized as Anārak; also known as Nārak) is a village in Khobriz Rural District, in the Central District of Arsanjan County, Fars Province, Iran. At the 2006 census, its population was 206, in 60 families.

References 

Populated places in Arsanjan County